Fruzsina Palkó (born 9 February 1992 in Szombathely) is a Hungarian handballer.

She also competed at the 2012 Women's Junior World Handball Championship in the Czech Republic.

Achievements 
Nemzeti Bajnokság I:
Winner: 2010, 2011, 2012
Magyar Kupa:
Winner: 2010, 2011, 2012
EHF Champions League:
Finalist: 2012
Semifinalist: 2010, 2011

References

External links 

 Fruzsina Palkó player profile on Győri Audi ETO KC Official Website
 Fruzsina Palkó career statistics at Worldhandball

1992 births
Living people
Sportspeople from Szombathely
Hungarian female handball players
Győri Audi ETO KC players